Dejan Sitar (born 9 December 1979), is a Slovenian athlete who competes in compound archery. He was the 2001 World Champion and was the world number one ranked archer for nearly two years from December 2001 to September 2003.

References

1979 births
Living people
Slovenian male archers
World Archery Championships medalists